The 1974–75 New England Whalers season was the Whalers' third season of play. It was also the first season the franchise played in Hartford, Connecticut. Ryan was replaced by Kelley before the playoffs started; the Whalers lost to Minnesota in 6 games.

Offseason

Regular season

Final standings

Schedule and results

Playoffs

Game Two at Hartford on April 11 went to overtime and the Whalers won in the extra period 3–2.  The game was famous for a huge brawl early in the second period that involved both benches and lasted nearly five full minutes; the primary fighters were Nick Fotiu, Bill Butters, and Jack Carlson that raged on the ice and even in the penalty boxes.

Minnesota Fighting Saints 4, New England Whalers 2 – Division Quarterfinals

Player statistics

Awards and records

Transactions

Draft picks
New England's draft picks at the 1974 WHA Amateur Draft.

Farm teams

See also
1974–75 WHA season

References

External links

New
New
New England Whalers seasons
New England
New England